William Nelson Rotton (January 22, 1927 – March 7, 2013) was an American curler and curling coach.

From 1988 to 1992 he was a President of the International Curling Fellowship of Rotarians.

Record as a coach of national teams

References

External links 

1927 births
2013 deaths
Sportspeople from Lincoln, Nebraska
People from New Hartford, New York
American male curlers
American curling coaches
University of Nebraska alumni
Yale University alumni
Columbia University alumni